Jaipur, formerly Jeypore, is the capital and largest city of the Indian state of Rajasthan. , the city had a population of 3.1 million, making it the tenth most populous city in the country. Jaipur is also known as the Pink City, due to the dominant colour scheme of its buildings. It is also known as the Paris of India, and C. V. Raman called it the Island of Glory. Jaipur was founded in 1727 by the Kachhwaha Rajput ruler Jai Singh II, the ruler of Amer, after whom the city is named. It was one of the earliest planned cities of modern India, designed by Vidyadhar Bhattacharya. During the British Colonial period, the city served as the capital of Jaipur State. After independence in 1947, Jaipur was made the capital of the newly formed state of Rajasthan.

Jaipur is a popular tourist destination in India and forms a part of the west Golden Triangle tourist circuit along with Delhi and Agra. It also serves as a gateway to other tourist destinations in Rajasthan such as Jodhpur, Jaisalmer, Bharatpur, Udaipur, Kota (252 km, 156 mi) and Mount Abu.

On 6 July 2019, UNESCO World Heritage Committee inscribed Jaipur the "Pink City of India" among its World Heritage Sites. The city is also home to the UNESCO World Heritage Sites Amer Fort and Jantar Mantar.

History 

The city of Jaipur was founded by the King of Amber, Maharaja Sawai Jai Singh II on 18 November 1727, who ruled from 1699 to 1743. He planned to shift his capital from Amber,  to Jaipur to accommodate the growing population and increasing scarcity of water. Jai Singh consulted several books on architecture and architects while planning the layout of Jaipur. Under the architectural guidance of Vidyadhar Bhattacharya, Jaipur was planned based on the principles of Vastu Shastra and Shilpa Shastra. The construction of the city began in 1726 and took four years to complete the major roads, offices, and palaces. The architecture of the city was heavily influenced by the 17th century architectural renaissance during Mughal rule in Northern India. Hence much of it resembles architecture styles from around the Muslim world. The city was divided into nine blocks, two of which contained the state buildings and palaces, with the remaining seven allotted to the public. Huge ramparts were built, pierced by seven fortified gates.

During the rule of Sawai Ram Singh I, the city was painted pink to welcome HRH Albert Edward, Prince of Wales (who later became King Edward VII, Emperor of India), in 1876. Many of the avenues still remain painted in pink, giving Jaipur a distinctive appearance and the epithet Pink city.

In the 19th century, the city grew rapidly and by 1900 it had a population of 160,000. The wide boulevards were paved and its chief industries were the working of metals and marble, fostered by a school of art founded in 1868. The city had three colleges, including a Sanskrit college (1865) and a girls' school (1867) opened during the reign of the Maharaja Ram Singh II.

Large areas of the city including the airport were flooded in August 1981, resulting in the death of eight people and much damage to the city's Dravyavati River. The floods were caused by three days of cloud burst that produced more rain than the annual average.

Geography

Topography
The city is surrounded by fertile alluvial plains to the east and south and hill chains and desert areas to the north and west. Jaipur generally slopes downwards from north to south and then to the southeast. The city is surrounded by the Nahargarh hills in the north and Jhalana in the east, which is a part of the Aravalli range.

Dravyavati river is the primary drainage channel which by 2014 had degenerated into an untreated sewage nallah. To address this  issue, a contract for the rejuvenation of the river was awarded to a consortium comprising Tata Projects and the Shanghai Urban Construction Group by the JDA.  A 13-km stretch of Dravyavati riverfront out of 47.5km was opened for residents in 2018 and the remaining project was completed in 2022.

Climate 
Jaipur has a monsoon-influenced hot semi-arid climate (Köppen climate classification BSh) with long, extremely hot summers and short, mild to warm winters. Annual precipitation is over 63 cm, falling mostly in July and August due to monsoon, causing the average temperatures in these two months to be lower compared to drier May and June. During the monsoon, there are frequent, heavy rains and thunderstorms, but flooding is not common. The city's average temperature remains below  between December and February. These months are mild, dry, and pleasant, sometimes chilly. Jaipur, like many other major cities of the world, is a significant urban heat island zone with surrounding rural temperatures occasionally falling below freezing in winters.

Demographics 

According to the provisional report of 2011 census, Jaipur city had a population of 3,073,350. The overall literacy rate for the city is 84.34%. 90.61% males and 77.41% females were literate. The sex ratio was 898 females per 1,000 males & the child sex ratio was recorded 854.
However, the population of the city is expected to grow up to around 39.1 lakhs (3.91 million).

Languages 
The official language of Jaipur is Hindi and the additional official language is English. The native and main dialect of the city is Dhundari. The Marwari and Standard Hindi dialects are also spoken, along with English.

Religion 

According to the 2011 census, Hindus form the majority religious group accounting for 87.9% of the city's population, followed by Muslims (8.6%), Jains (2.4%) and others (1.2%).

Governance and politics

Civic administration 
The Jaipur Municipal Corporation (JMC) was established in the year 1994. The area of the municipal corporation is 467 square km and it is governed under the Rajasthan Municipality Act of 1959. The municipal corporation is headed by a mayor.

JMC was recently bifurcated into two Municipal Corporations, namely Greater Jaipur Municipal Corporation and Jaipur Heritage Municipal Corporation. Originally, the municipality had 91 wards and each ward was represented by an elected member. However, the Local Self Government Department of Rajasthan divided Jaipur into two municipal corporations, namely Greater Jaipur Municipal Corporation and Heritage Jaipur Municipal Corporation, with 150 and 100 wards each, respectively.

The latest elections were held in October 2020, which were postponed due to COVID-19. However, elections for the 100 wards of Jaipur Heritage Municipal Corporation were held on 29 October 2020.

The mayor is the elected representative of the city. The current mayor of Jaipur Municipal Corporation (Greater) is Smt. Somya Gurjar since 10 November 2020 and the mayor for Jaipur Municipal Corporation (Heritage) is Smt. Munesh Gurjar since 10 November 2020.  The administration duties are carried out by the municipal commissioner and his group of officials. The municipal commissioner of Jaipur is Mahendra Soni (IAS).

The estimated municipal budget for the year 2022-23 is 8950 lakhs. The key revenue sources for Jaipur municipality are taxes which include House tax, Urban Development tax and octroi compensation. Along with this it also gains revenue from various fees and user charges. The masterplan for the city 2025 was created by the Jaipur Development Authority.

Legislative assembly and state agencies 
Jaipur consists of two parliamentary constituencies Jaipur and Jaipur Rural. The political party with a majority in Jaipur is the Indian National Congress. It also has electives from the BJP and INC.

The Jaipur Lok Sabha constituency comprises eight Vidhansabha (legislative assembly) segments, all of which fall partly in Jaipur city. MLA for Hawa Mahal is Mahesh Joshi from INC, MLA for Vidhyadhar Nagar is Narpat Singh Rajvi from BJP, MLA for Civil Lines is Pratap Singh Khachariyavas from INC, MLA for Kishanpole is Amin Kagzi from INC, MLA for Adarsh Nagar is Rafeek Khan from INC, MLA for Malviya Nagar constituency is Kalicharan Saraf from BJP, MLA for Sanganer constituency is Ashok Lahoty from BJP and lastly the MLA for Bagru is Ganga Devi from INC.

The city police in Jaipur is under the jurisdiction of the Rajasthan State Department. The current Police Commissioner for Jaipur City Police is Mr. Anand Srivastava. In Jaipur City, there is a District and Sessions court present. It also has a family court.

The District Collector or District Magistrate for Jaipur City is Prakash Rajpurohit.

Civic utilities 
Jaipur Development Authority (JDA) is the nodal government agency responsible for the planning and development of Jaipur. Jaipur also falls under the Jaipur district of the state of Rajasthan in western India. There are 13 tehsils in the district, which are named Jaipur, Amer, Bassi, Chaksu, Chomu, Mojmabad, Jamwa Ramgarh, Phage, Phulera, Kotputli, Sanganer, Shahpura, Viratnagar. The total area of the district is 14068 square km.

Jaipur Municipal Corporation is responsible for maintaining the city's civic infrastructure and carrying out associated administrative duties.

Electricity in Jaipur City is supplied through Jaipur Vidyut Vitaran Nigam LTD(JVVNL) by the Government of Rajasthan. Jaipur MC has a fire department wing and there are 11 fire stations, with 50 fire tenders in the state capital. However, with the city is expanding and the population increasing, the existing infrastructure is not sufficient to cater to the city's requirements. Jaipur, a Tier 2 city, also does not have rescue tenders, used for cutting material, or a turntable ladder (TTL), used for dousing flames from aerial angles without entering the building.

Water supply, sewerage and drainage 
The Rajasthan government has formed the Jaipur Water Supply and Sewerage Board (JWSSB) for the management of water supply and sewerage services in urban areas of the city. JWSSB, an autonomous body, has been constituted under the JWSSB Ordinance, 2018. It will ensure water supply as per the standards stipulated by the Bureau of Indian Standards, the State Pollution Control Board or Rajasthan's Public Health Engineering Department (PHED). JWSSB will be responsible for financing, designing, constructing, altering, repairing, operating, and maintaining various water supply and sewerage schemes. It will also provide meters and carry out commercial services such as meter reading, billing, and revenue collection.

The Jaipur Development Authority has divided the city into four main drainage zones with the northern and central zones draining into the Dravyavati river while the western zone drains into the Chandler lake and the eastern and southern areas combined drain into the Dhundh River. Sewerage systems and STPs have been constructed accordingly with the installed capacity being 730 km of sewer lines and 442 MLD of sewage treatment.

Solid waste management 
The corporation has a new solid waste management system that includes door-to-door collection, transportation of garbage in covered vehicles, proper deployment of dustbins, use of modern equipment. The system ensures private investment as well as public participation with a small amount of monthly user charges. The size of the JMC garbage can be kept at a manageable level.

Complete Sanitation work in 3 zones, namely, Hawamahal Zone (East), Hawamahal (West), Motidungari Zone, and Pratap Nagar has been contracted out through National Tendering.

Tourism 

Jaipur is a major tourist destination in India forming a part of the Golden Triangle. In the 2008 Conde Nast Traveller Readers Choice Survey, Jaipur was ranked the 7th best place to visit in Asia.
According to TripAdvisor's 2015 Traveller's Choice Awards for Destination, Jaipur ranked 1st among the Indian destinations for the year.

Jaipur Exhibition & Convention Centre (JECC) is Rajasthan's biggest convention and exhibition centre. It is famous for organising events such as Vastara, Jaipur Jewellery Show, Stonemart 2015 and Resurgent Rajasthan Partnership Summit 2015.

Visitor attractions include the Birla Auditorium, Albert Hall Museum, Hawa Mahal, Jal Mahal, City Palace, Amer Fort, Jantar Mantar, Nahargarh Fort, Jaigarh Fort, Birla Mandir, Galtaji, Govind Dev Ji Temple, Garh Ganesh Temple, Moti Dungri Ganesh Temple, Sanghiji Jain temple and the Jaipur Zoo. The Jantar Mantar observatory (The Jantar Mantar is a collection of 19 astronomical instruments remarkable at their time.) and Amer Fort are one of the World Heritage Sites. Hawa Mahal is a five-storey pyramidal shaped monument with 953 windows that rises  from its high base. Sisodiya Rani Bagh and Kanak Vrindavan are the major parks in Jaipur. Raj Mandir is a notable cinema hall in Jaipur.

Jaipur now has options to view the entire city via a Hot Air Balloon ride.

Travel+Leisure – The World's Best Awards 2020

Jaipur was ranked Number 8 in "The Top 15 Cities in Asia".

Culture 
Jaipur has many cultural sites like Jawahar Kala Kendra formed by Architect Charles Correa and Ravindra Manch. Government Central Museum hosts several arts and antiquities. There is a government museum at Hawa Mahal and an art gallery at Viratnagar. There are statues depicting Rajasthani culture around the city. Jaipur has many traditional shops selling antiques and handicrafts, as well as contemporary brands reviving traditional techniques, such as Anokhi. The prior rulers of Jaipur patronised a number of arts and crafts. They invited skilled artisans, artists and craftsmen from India and abroad who settled in the city. Some of the crafts include bandhani, block printing, stone carving and sculpture, tarkashi, zari, gota-patti, kinari and zardozi, silver jewellery, gems, kundan, meenakari and jewellery, Lakh ki Chudiya, miniature paintings, blue pottery, ivory carving, shellac work and leather ware.

Jaipur has its own performing arts. The Jaipur Gharana for Kathak is one of the three gharanas of the major north Indian classical dance form of Kathak. The Jaipur Gharana of Kathak is known for its rapid intricate dance forms, vivacious body movements and subtle Abhinaya. The Ghoomar is a popular folk dance style. Tamasha is an art form where Kathputli puppet dance is shown in play form. Major festivals celebrated in Jaipur include Elephant Festival, Gangaur, Makar Sankranti, Holi, Diwali, Vijayadashami, Teej, Eid, Mahavir Jayanti and Christmas. Jaipur is also famous for the Jaipur Literature Festival, the world's largest free literature festival in which authors, writers and literature lovers from all over the country participate.

Architecture 

The city was planned according to the Indian Vastu shastra by Vidyadhar Bhattacharya in 1727. There are three gates facing east, west, and north. The eastern gate is called Suraj pol (sun gate), the western gate is called Chand pol (moon gate) and the northern gate faces the ancestral capital of Amer.

The city is unusual among pre-modern Indian cities in the regularity of its streets, and the division of the city into six sectors by broad streets 34 m (111  ft) wide. The urban quarters are further divided by networks of gridded streets. Five-quarters wrap around the east, south, and west sides of a central palace quarter, with a sixth quarter immediately to the east. The Palace quarter encloses the Hawa Mahal palace complex, formal gardens, and a small lake. Nahargarh Fort, which was the residence of the King Sawai Jai Singh II, crowns the hill in the northwest corner of the old city.

Cuisine 

Typical dishes include Dal Baati Churma, Missi Roti, Gatte ki Sabzi, Lahsun ki chutney, Ker Sangri, Makke ki Ghat, Bajre ki Ghat, Bajre ki Roti and Laal Maans. Jaipur is also known for its sweets which include Ghevar, Feeni, Mawa Kachori, Gajak, Meethi thuli, Chauguni ke laddu, and Moong Thal.

Economy 

As per the official records released by the Directorate of Economics and Statistics (Rajasthan), the GDP(nominal) of Jaipur district is estimated at INR 1,22,140 crores ($15.8 billion) in 2020–21, with a per-capita GDP of INR 1,41,305. In addition to its role as the provincial capital, educational, and administrative centre, the economy of Jaipur is fuelled by tourism, gemstone cutting, the manufacture of jewellery and luxury textiles, and information technology.

Three major trade promotion organisations have their offices in Jaipur. These are: Federation of Indian Chambers of Commerce & Industry, (FICCI) the PHD Chamber of Commerce and Industry (PHDCCI) and the Confederation of Indian Industry (CII) which has its regional offices here. In 2008, Jaipur was ranked 31 among the 50 Emerging Global Outsourcing cities. Jaipur Stock Exchange was one of the regional stock exchanges in India and was founded in 1989 but was closed in March 2015.

Jaipur has emerged as a hub of automotive industries. JCB, Hero MotoCorp and Robert Bosch GmbH have their manufacturing plants in Jaipur. Chemical manufacturers in the city are Aro Granite and Emami Agrotech. National Engineering Industries have a plant in Jaipur.

The city is among top emerging IT hubs of India along with Ahmedabad, Bhubaneswar and Kochi. Mahindra World City is an integrated business zone in Jaipur. It is home to several software and IT companies including Genpact, Appirio, Infosys, Wipro, ICICI Bank, Connexions and Deutsche Bank. The Government of Rajasthan have built Asia's largest incubator in Jaipur – the Bhamashah Techno Hub.

Jaipur is a major hub for arts and crafts. It has many traditional shops selling antiques, jewellery, handicrafts, gems, bangles, pottery, carpets, textiles, leather and metal products. Jaipur is one of India's largest manufacturers of hand-knotted rugs. Jaipur foot, a rubber-based prosthetic leg for people with below-knee amputations, was designed and is produced in Jaipur. World Trade Park Jaipur, is a shopping mall in Jaipur opened in 2012.

Communication 
Jaipur has offices of companies like Airtel, Jio, VI (Vodafone-Idea) and BSNL which are providing mobile telephony and there are also various internet service providers in the city. The government of Rajasthan has started free WiFi at various public places like Central Park, Jantar Mantar among others. Rajasthan's first ISP  Data Ingenious Global Limited still providing large number of broadband customers and email services in entire Jaipur.

Broadband Services 
Jaipur has got a good network of broadband services both in Old Jaipur and New Jaipur. Jaipur is served by BSNL FTTH, Tata Play Fiber, ACT, Data Ingenious, Jio and Airtel.

Media 
Major daily newspapers in Jaipur include Amar Ujala, Rajasthan Patrika, Dainik Bhaskar, Indian Express, Dainik Navajyoti and The Times of India. The state-owned All India Radio is broadcast both on the medium wave and FM band in the city. Private FM stations include Radio Mirchi (98.3 MHz), Radio City (91.1 MHz), My FM (94.3 MHz), FM Tadka 95 FM (95.0 MHz), Mirchi Love (104.0 MHz), Red FM 93.5 (93.5 MHz) and Gyan Vani (105.6 MHz). The city has a community FM channel in FM Radio 7 (90.4 MHz) by India International School Institutional Network. The public broadcaster Doordarshan (Prasar Bharati) provides a regional channel in addition to the private broadcasters.

Transport

Roads 
Jaipur is located on National Highway No.48 connecting Delhi and Mumbai. National Highway 52 links Jaipur with Kota and National Highway 21 links Jaipur with Agra. RSRTC operates bus service to major cities in Rajasthan, New Delhi, Uttar Pradesh, Haryana, Madhya Pradesh, Maharashtra, Punjab and Gujarat. City buses are operated by Jaipur City Transport Services Limited (JCTSL) of RSRTC. The service operates more than 400 regular and low-floor buses. Major bus depots are located at Vaishali Nagar, Vidyadhar Nagar and Sanganer.

Jaipur BRTS was approved by the government in August 2006. Jaipur BRTS is managed by JCSTL, a special purpose vehicle formed by Jaipur Development Authority and Jaipur Nagar Nigam. In Phase I, two corridors have been proposed: a "North-South Corridor" from Sikar Road to Tonk Road and an "East-West Corridor" from Ajmer Road to Delhi Road. A section of the North-South Corridor from bypass near Harmada to Pani Pech became operational in 2010.

Jaipur Ring Road is a project of Jaipur Development Authority to reduce increasing traffic of Jaipur city which connects NH-21 (Agra Road), NH-48 (Ajmer Road), NH-52 (Tonk Road), and NH-52 (Malpura Road) having a length of 150 km. The 57 km out of 150 km long six-lane Jaipur Ring Road has been completed at a cost of Rs. 1217 crore which was inaugurated by Sushma Swaraj, Arun Jaitley and Nitin Gadkari.

Bhawani Singh Road, named after the last Maharaja of Jaipur which begins from Nehru Sahkar Bhawan and ends at the intersection where Birla Mandir is situated is one of the most popular roads in the city with notable places like Rambagh Palace, Golf Club and Jaipur Development Authority Office falling on its path. A similarly named road; Bhawani Singh Lane, serves as a place where the prominent people of Jaipur reside. The road also serves as a passage for the offices of companies like ETV Rajasthan, Redington India Limited, Hal Clyde Denison, and Rajasthan Tourism Bureau.

Rail 

Jaipur is the headquarters of North Western Railway Zone of Indian Railways.

Metro 

Jaipur Metro commenced commercial operation on 3 June 2015. Phase-1A is operational between Mansarovar and Chandpole consisting of nine stations namely Mansarovar, New Aatish Market, Vivek Vihar, Shyam Nagar, Ram Nagar, Civil Line, Railway Station, Sindhi Camp and Chandpole. The Phase-1B was constructed with an estimated cost of 97.32 billion ($1.74 billion). It became operational on 23 September 2020.

Airport 
Jaipur International Airport is in Sanganer,  from the centre. The airport handled 363,899 international and 2,540,451 domestic passengers in 2015–2016. Jaipur Airport also provides air cargo services. During winter, sometimes flights towards Indira Gandhi International Airport are diverted to Jaipur Airport due to heavy fog in Delhi.

Education 

Public and private schools in Jaipur are governed by the Central Board of Secondary Education or Board of Secondary Education, Rajasthan, International Board of education and follow a "10+2" plan. This plan entails eight years of primary education and four years of secondary education. The secondary school includes two years of upper secondary education, which is more specific and diverse than the two years of lower secondary education before it. Languages of instruction include English and Hindi.

Notable institutions in the city are:
 University of Rajasthan
 Rajasthan University of Health Sciences
 Dr. Bhimrao Ambedkar Law University
 Rajasthan Sanskrit University
 Haridev Joshi University of Journalism and Mass Communication
 Suresh Gyan Vihar University 
 Malaviya National Institute of Technology
 LNM Institute of Information Technology 
 University of Technology
 National Institute of Ayurveda
 Sawai Man Singh Medical College
 Subodh College 
There are several digital marketing institutes in Jaipur As EIIM, Digilearning, Quibus training to name a few.

Admission to Engineering colleges in Jaipur, many of which are affiliated to Rajasthan Technical University (Kota), is through Rajasthan Engineering Admission Process. Some of the colleges that are affiliated to Rajasthan Technical University are Maharishi Arvind Institute of Engineering & Technology, Poornima College of Engineering,  Arya Group of Colleges.

Sports 

The main cricket stadium in the city, Sawai Mansingh Stadium, has a seating capacity of 30,000 and has hosted national and international cricket matches. It is also the home ground of IPL team Rajasthan Royals. Sawai Mansingh Indoor Stadium, Chaugan Stadium and Railway Cricket Ground are the other sporting arenas in the city.

A new stadium has been proposed for Chonp Village with a seating capacity 75,000. It would be the third-largest cricket stadium in the world after the Sardar Patel Stadium and the Melbourne Cricket Ground.

The city is represented in the IPL by Rajasthan Royals (2008–2016; 2018–present) and in Pro Kabaddi League by Jaipur Pink Panthers.

A new cricket stadium located 27 km from Jaipur is under construction. In July 2021, Chief Minister Ashok Gehlot said that the stadium will have a total seating capacity of 75000 and will be constructed in two phases, of which the seating accommodation of 45,000 people will be completed in the first phase and expansion for another 30,000 will be done in the second phase.

In popular culture 
Paul McCartney wrote and recorded the Jaipur tribute song "Riding into Jaipur" (4:08) whose minimalist lyrics say: « riding to Jaipur, riding through the night, riding with my baby, oh what a delight, oh what a delight, it is. » The song was released on his 2001 studio album Driving Rain.

Jaipur is the setting for the film The Best Exotic Marigold Hotel and its sequel, The Second Best Exotic Marigold Hotel, which follow the adventures of a group of senior European ex-pats who retire to Jaipur and in the process discover their true selves.

Notable people 

 Ila Arun
 Asrani, Indian Actor
 Smita Bansal, Indian Actress
 Daulat Mal Bhandari
 Vikrant Bhargava
 Vishwa Mohan Bhatt
 Apurvi Chandela
 Ajay Data, Indian entrepreneur
 Gayatri Devi ( 23 May 1919 – 29 July 2009), Maharani of Jaipur
 Anshu Jain (1963–2022), banker
 Syed Akbar Jaipuri (1928–1998), Urdu poet from Jaipur
 Hasrat Jaipuri (1922–1999), Urdu-Hindi poet and Bollywood lyricist
 Mungtu Ram Jaipuria, Indian industrialist and educationist, son of Anandaram Jaipuria and the founder of Seth Anandram Jaipuria College and Seth M.R. Jaipuria Schools including Seth Anandram Jaipuria School Lucknow
 Rajaram Jaipuria (1934–2015), Indian industrialist and educationist, son of Mungtu Ram Jaipuria
 Ravi Jaipuria, Indian businessman
 Sitaram Jaipuria (1926–1985), Indian politician
 Rohit Jangid, wushu player
 Irrfan Khan, Indian actor in Bollywood, British and American films
 Habib Miyan, claimed to be the oldest man in the world
 Jesse Randhawa
 Man Singh II (21 August 1912 – 24 June 1970)
 Ashish Sharma
 Shubhi Sharma Indian actress who is active mainly in Bhojpuri-language films
 Sunil Vaswani
 Hafiz Salahuddin Yusuf

See also 
Gram Bharati Samiti
Jaipuria Vidyalaya
Tehsils of Jaipur:

 Chomu
 Shahpura
 Sanganer
 Phulera

References

Further reading 
 Bhatt, Kavi Shiromani; Shastry, Mathuranath (1948). Jaipur Vaibhawam (History of Jaipur written in Sanskrit). Re-published in 2002 by Kalanath Shastry, Manjunath Smriti Sansthan, Jaipur.
 Khangarot, R.S., Nathawat, P.S.  (1990) Jaigarh- The Invincible Fort of Amer. RBSA Publishers, Jaipur.
 Sachdev, Vibhuti; Tillotson, Giles Henry Rupert (2002). Building Jaipur: The Making of an Indian City. Reaktion Books, London. .
 Sarkar, Jadunath (1984). A History of Jaipur. Orient Longman Limited, New Delhi. .
 Volwahsen, Andreas (2001). Cosmic Architecture in India: The Astronomical Monuments of Maharaja Jai Singh II, Prestel Mapin, Munich.

External links 

 
Metropolitan cities in India
Cities and towns in Jaipur district
Indian capital cities
Smart cities in India
Populated places established in 1727
1727 establishments in India
Former capital cities in India
World Heritage Sites in India
Planned cities in India